Jhon Adolfo Arias Andrade (born 21 September 1997) is a Colombian footballer who plays as winger for Brazilian club Fluminense.

Club career
Born in Quibdó, Arias represented Mexican sides Dorados de Sinaloa and Tijuana as a youth. He returned to his home country in 2017 and signed for Patriotas Boyacá, before moving out on loan to Llaneros for the 2018 season.

Upon returning to Patriotas, Arias was regularly used during the 2019 campaign before signing a contract with América de Cali on 10 December of that year. On 7 January 2021, he joined Independiente Santa Fe.

On 18 August 2021, Arias moved abroad for the first time in his career, after agreeing to a four-year contract with Campeonato Brasileiro Série A side Fluminense.

Career statistics

Honours
Fluminense
Campeonato Carioca: 2022

References

External links
Fluminense FC profile 

1997 births
Living people
People from Quibdó
Sportspeople from Chocó Department
Colombian footballers
Colombia international footballers
Colombian expatriate footballers
Colombian expatriate sportspeople in Brazil
Colombian expatriate sportspeople in Mexico
América de Cali footballers
Association football wingers
Campeonato Brasileiro Série A players
Categoría Primera A players
Categoría Primera B players
Expatriate footballers in Brazil
Expatriate footballers in Mexico
Fluminense FC players
Independiente Santa Fe footballers
Llaneros F.C. players
Patriotas Boyacá footballers